Virgibacillus kapii is a Gram-positive and rod-shaped bacterium from the genus of Virgibacillus which has been isolated from Thai shrimp paste from Nakhon Si Thammarat Province in Thailand.

References

External links
Type strain of Virgibacillus kapii at BacDive -  the Bacterial Diversity Metadatabase

Bacillaceae
Bacteria described in 2016